Swayback, also known clinically as lordosis, refers to abnormal bent-back postures in humans and in quadrupeds, especially horses. Extreme lordosis can cause physical damage to the spinal cord and associated ligaments and tendons which can lead to severe pain. Moderate lordosis does not generally impact a horse’s usefulness and does not necessarily cause lameness.

Humans
Swayback posture in humans is characterised by the posterior displacement of the rib cage in comparison to the pelvis. It looks like the person has a hyperextension of the lower back, however this is not necessarily the case. Most sway-back exhibits a posteriorly tilted pelvis; the lumbar region is usually flat (too flexed) and not hyperlordotic (too extended).

Horses

Usually called "swayback", soft back, or low back, an excessive downward bend in the back is an undesirable conformation trait. Swayback is caused in part from a loss of muscle tone in both the back and abdominal muscles, plus a weakening and stretching of the ligaments. As in humans, it may be influenced by bearing young; it is sometimes seen in a broodmare that has had multiple foals.  However, it is also common in older horses whose age leads to loss of muscle tone and stretched ligaments. It also occurs due to overuse or injury to the muscles and ligaments from excess work or loads, or from premature work placed upon an immature animal. Equines with too long a back are more prone to the condition than those with a short back, but as a longer back is also linked to smoother gaits, the trait is sometimes encouraged by selective breeding.  It has been found to have a hereditary basis in the American Saddlebred breed, transmitted via a recessive gene. Research into the genetics underlying the condition has several values beyond just the Saddlebred breed as it may "serve as a model for investigating congenital skeletal deformities in horses and other species."

See also
 Neutral spine
 Poor posture
 Scoliosis

References

Deforming dorsopathies
Congenital disorders of musculoskeletal system
Horse diseases